Murgleys, or Murgleis (possibly "Death brand") is the sword of Ganelon, a traitorous French (Frankish) count and nemesis to the titular hero of the epic La chanson de Roland (The Song of Roland).

According to the French version, its "gold pommel" held some kind of a "holy relic". In the Middle High German adaptation (Konrad der Pfaffe's Rolandslied) the sword is called Mulagir, touted to be the "best seax (type of sword) in all of France", described as having a carbuncle shining on its pommel, and forged by a smith named Madelger in Regensburg.

Etymology
Dorothy L. Sayers, a translator of The Song of Roland suggests the sword means "Death brand" (See #Similarly named swords below). Belgian scholar Rita Lejeune gave the meaning "Moorish sword," but Arabist James A. Bellamy proposed the Arabic etymology māriq ʾalyas meaning "valiant piercer".

Similarly named swords
At least three swords bearing the similar name Murglaie occur in other chansons de geste.

 Murglaie - sword of Elias, the Swan Knight of the Crusades cycle,
 Murglaie - sword of Cornumarant, the Saracen king of Jerusalem, taken by Baudouin de Syrie (the historical Baldwin I of Jerusalem)
 Murglaie - sword of Boeve de Haumtone; better known as Morglay of Bevis of Hampton.

Note that "Morglay" has been given the  etymology morte "death" + "glaive" coinciding with the conjectural meaning of "Death brand" for Ganelon's sword, proposed by Sayers.

References

Matter of France
Mythological swords